Alexander Müller is an Austrian skeleton racer who competed from 1989 to 2000. He won a bronze medal in the men's skeleton event (tied with Jimmy Shea of the United States) at the 2000 FIBT World Championships in Igls.

Müller won the men's overall Skeleton World Cup title in 1996-7.

References
List of men's skeleton World Cup champions since 1987.
Men's skeleton world championship medalists since 1989
Skeletonsport.com profile

Living people
Austrian male skeleton racers
Year of birth missing (living people)